Ram Nath Yadav is an Indian politician and a member of Bihar Legislative Assembly of India. He represents the Bikram constituency in Patna district of Bihar. He was elected since 1980, 1985, 1990 and 1995 as a member of Communist Party of India. Yadav contested 9th Lok Sabha from Patna in 1989 as a member of Communist Party of India but lost.

References

External links
Bihar Assembly Election Results in 1980
Bihar Assembly Election Results in 1985
Bihar Assembly Election Results in 1990
Bihar Assembly Election Results in 1995

(Serial number-212)

People from Patna
Bihar MLAs 1980–1985
Bihar MLAs 1985–1990
Bihar MLAs 1990–1995
Bihar MLAs 1995–2000
Communist Party of India politicians from Bihar
Year of birth missing
Possibly living people